Bolitoglossa borburata is a species of salamander in the family Plethodontidae.
It is endemic to Venezuela.
Its natural habitat is subtropical or tropical moist montane forests. It is also known as the Carabobo mushroomtongue.

The Carabobo Mushroomtongue has a snout–vent length of 5.5cm and it is robust with a large and truncated snout, short limbs, and webbed fingers and toes.

Sources

Bolitoglossa
Endemic fauna of Venezuela
Taxonomy articles created by Polbot
Amphibians described in 1942